Institut Pprime (sometimes written Institut P') is a CNRS laboratory created in 2010 and based in Poitiers, France.

Presentation 
The institute depends from the University of Poitiers, ENSI Poitiers and Ensma and has the UPR number 3346. It is the second-largest laboratory from engineering science in France with 572 people working for it in 2014. It has locations in both campus of Poitiers and Futuroscope. It is currently led by Yves Gervais since 2014 after Jean-Paul Bonnet.

The laboratory is sub-divided in three departments:
 Physics and Mechanics of Materials
 Fluids, Thermal and Combustion Sciences
 Mechanics, Structures and Complex Systems

It is the merger of six previous laboratories which was:
 LCD , Laboratoire de combustion et de détonique (Laboratory of Combustion and Detonics) UPR 9028
 LEA , Laboratoire d’études aérodynamiques (Laboratory of Aerodynamic Studies) UMR 6609
 LET, Laboratoire d’études thermiques (Laboratory of Thermal Studies) UMR 6608
 PhyMat, Laboratoire de physique des matériaux (Laboratory of Materials Physics) UMR 6630
 LMPM, Laboratoire de mécanique et physique des matériaux (Laboratory of Mechanics and Physics of Materials) UMR 6617
 LMS, Laboratoire de mécanique des solides Laboratory of Solid Mechanics) UMR 6610

See also 
 IC2MP, a laboratory specializing in chemistry in Poitiers

References

External links
 

Physics institutes
University of Poitiers
French National Centre for Scientific Research
Research institutes established in 2010
2010 establishments in France